Keith Ralph Hall (born June 30, 1947) was the 12th director of the National Reconnaissance Office (NRO).

Mr. Hall was appointed Deputy Director NRO and acting Director NRO concurrently in 1996, and promptly introduced financial management reforms culminating in a single NRO accounting system.  He also convened an independent body of experts from the defense, intelligence, and corporate sectors to evaluate the future of the NRO.

Bringing the NRO to a financial sound position, Mr. Hall boosted the agency's credibility and made it a government-wide acquisition and contracting center of excellence. He strengthened the NRO's commitment to advanced research and development to revolutionize overhead reconnaissance architecture. Following his service at the NRO, Hall became a senior vice president at Booz Allen Hamilton.

Hall was born in Rockville Centre, New York and graduated from Valley Stream Central High School in June 1965. He earned a B.A. degree in history and political science from Alfred University in June 1969. Hall was commissioned as a United States Army intelligence officer in 1970, serving until 1979 and receiving two Meritorious Service Medals. He also received a Master of Public Administration degree from Clark University in June 1979.

Hall served as Deputy Assistant Secretary of Defense for Intelligence and Security from 1991 to 1995. While serving as director of the National Reconnaissance Office, he concurrently served as Assistant Secretary of the Air Force for Space from 1997 to 2001. Hall received an honorary Doctor of Science degree from Alfred University in 1997.

References

External links
National Reconnaissance Office: Directors List

1947 births
Living people
People from Rockville Centre, New York
Valley Stream Central High School alumni
Alfred University alumni
United States Army officers
Recipients of the Meritorious Service Medal (United States)
Clark University alumni
United States Department of Defense officials
Directors of the National Reconnaissance Office
Clinton administration personnel
United States Air Force civilians
George W. Bush administration personnel
Booz Allen Hamilton people